Mark Ridley’s Comedy Castle is a comedy club located in Metro Detroit, at 310 S. Troy St., Royal Oak, Michigan 48067.

History 
Mark Ridley first opened the Comedy Castle on January 4, 1979, in the basement of a Bloomfield Hills, Michigan restaurant. Ridley created the three comic set (emcee, feature performer, and headliner) to better organize shows and stage time each night after witnessing an endless line of performers at Los Angeles clubs like The Improv and The Comedy Store, making Mark Ridley’s Comedy Castle one of the first clubs in the nation to do so. During the first 11 years of the club’s existence, it changed locations six times. In 1990, The Comedy Castle established its permanent 400-seat location in Royal Oak. It is the oldest operating comedy club in Michigan.

Philanthropy 

Mark Ridley’s Comedy Castle hosts several charitable events for a small fee, allowing organizations to price tickets accordingly for their fundraising. Each year, however, the Comedy Castle donates the room, food from Garden Fresh Salsa, and underwrites performances along with Michigan Financial Companies for The Salvation Army Bed and Bread Club, where they raise around $40,000 each year. Other benefits include the American Cancer Society, Infant Mortality Night, Furniture Bank of Southeastern Michigan, South Oakland Homeless Shelter, Common Ground Shelter, Guardians for Animals, and the Royal Oak Police Officer Association, among many more. All proceeds go to the charities.

Television 

The Comedy Castle has hosted several television specials, including Showtime Comedy Club Network, HBO's Comic Relief, A&E's Comedy on the Road with John Byner, and the Comcast Comedy Spotlight. In 1991, Mark Ridley’s Comedy Castle produced and hosted the Emmy Award winning “Funny Side of the Street” , a local variety show featuring Tim Allen.

Mark Ridley’s Comedy Castle promoted the taping of Kathleen Madigan’s 2013 comedy special “Madigan Again”, filmed at the Royal Oak Music Theater.

Comedy Festivals 

Mark Ridley’s Comedy Castle hosted the first Detroit International Comedy Festival in 2008. The following year, Mark Ridley produced and filmed the Detroit International Comedy Festival for theatrical and home video release. In 2010, Lewis Black emceed and headlined the festival.  The Comedy Castle also produced Laugh-a-Palooza each year, featuring many up and coming comedians from around the United States and Canada.

In addition to comedy festivals, Mark Ridley’s Comedy Castle also hosts a stand-up comedy class for those that desire to learn about writing jokes, performing in front of an audience, and working in a club.   Local comedian Bill Bushart, who the Metro Times named “Detroit’s Best Comedian 2010,” teaches the class.

Notable Performers 

A month after opening its doors, Tim Allen walked on stage for the first time. For years, the Comedy Castle was Allen’s home club. In 2015, Allen admitted to stealing a tile from the floor of the original Comedy Castle on Jimmy Kimmel Live!

Mark Ridley’s Comedy Castle’s first headliner was Mike Binder, then trying to break out as a stand-up comedian. He was living in Los Angeles at the time and called Mark Ridley to ask if he could be the Comedy Castle’s first headliner. Other notable comedians and performers that got their start at the Comedy Castle are Paul Feig, J. Chris Newberg, and Dax Shepard. Comedian and actor Bob Saget was an early headliner at the Comedy Castle, where he met future Full House co-star Dave Coulier, a Detroit grown comedian and regular headliner.

In 1996, Bill Engvall recorded his debut comedy album “Here’s Your Sign” at the Comedy Castle, followed by his second album “Dorkfish” in 1998. Both albums were certified gold and platinum.

The only club that comedian Kathleen Madigan will work outside of her normal theater tour is Mark Ridley’s Comedy Castle.

List of Notable Performers 

Comedians who have performed in the club include:

 Adam DeVine
 Bill Engvall
 Bill Farmer
 B. J. Novak
 Bob Saget
 Bobby Lee
 Brody Stevens
 Bryan Callen
 Carlos Mencia
 Chelsea Peretti
 Chris D'Elia
 Colin Kane
 Dave Attell
 Dave Coulier
 David Alan Grier
 Dax Shepard
 Dennis Miller
 Deon Cole
 Dom Irrera
 Dov Davidoff
 Drew Carey
 Drew Lynch
 Eric Andre
 Ellen DeGeneres
 Garry Shandling
 Gerry Bednob
 Godfrey
 Harland Williams
 Iliza Shlesinger
 Jamie Kennedy
 Jay Leno
 J. Chris Newberg
 Jeff Foxworthy
 Jerry Seinfeld
 Jim Breuer
 Jim Carrey
 Joe Rogan
 John Mulaney
 Jon Stewart
 Kathleen Madigan
 Kevin James
 Kevin Nealon
 Lewis Black
 Louie Anderson
 Marc Maron
 Mike Binder
 Paul Feig
 Paul Reiser
 Ralph Garman
 Ralphie May
 Ron White
 Rosie O'Donnell
 Tim Allen

References

External links 
 Comedy Castle Official Website

Comedy clubs in the United States
Royal Oak, Michigan
Tourist attractions in Oakland County, Michigan